"Jailbreak" is a song by Thin Lizzy that originally appeared as the title track on their 1976 album Jailbreak. Along with "The Boys Are Back in Town", it is one of their most popular songs, played frequently on classic rock radio.

The song is typical of the band's music, with the dual lead guitar harmony and Brian Robertson's use of the wah-wah pedal.  Phil Lynott's lyrics about a prison break are the typical personification of the "tough guys", also seen in "The Boys Are Back in Town" and the regular concert closer and fan favourite "The Rocker". An alternate version of the song appeared on the bonus disc of the 2011 remastered deluxe edition of the Jailbreak album, featuring a short spoken introduction and additional guitar parts throughout.

Charts

Use in media
In December 2008, the song was named the 73rd best hard rock song of all time by VH1.

"Jailbreak" is used in the films Detroit Rock City, Joe Dirt, Bordello of Blood, and Gracie. and was also used in the Veronica Mars episode "Ahoy, Mateys!" and on the MTV show Jackass.

On 3 February 2009, a live version of the song (from the Still Dangerous live album) was released as download content for the Rock Band series as part of a Thin Lizzy pack (which also contained versions of "The Boys Are Back in Town" and "Cowboy Song" from the same album).

Cover versions

 The Minnesota-based glam metal band Slave Raider covered the song on their second album, What Do You Know About Rock 'N Roll?, in 1988.
 Master covered the song on their album Collection of Souls in 1993.
 A live cover of the song by Jon Bon Jovi was also used as the b-side to "Queen of New Orleans" in 1997.
 Fu Manchu covered the song as their contribution to a split 7-inch with Fatso Jetson in 1998. It was added to Godzilla's/Eatin' Dust re-issue in 2019.
 American death metal band Six Feet Under covered the song on their Maximum Violence album in 1999.
 Blue Öyster Cult covered the song live (featuring guitarist Al Pitrelli) in 1999.
 Supersuckers performed it on their 2004 live album Live at The Magic Bag, Ferndale, MI
 Gary Moore played the song in the 2005 festival One Night in Dublin which was later released in 2006.
 Dropkick Murphys recorded it for their 2007 album The Meanest of Times, as a bonus track.
 "Jailbreak" is sampled heavily in the 2008 Girl Talk song "Don't Stop."
 Grave Digger released cover on their EP Ballads of a Hangman in 2009.
 Anthrax covered the song on their 2013 EP Anthems.
 Europe covered the song with Scott Gorham as a special guest during Europe's 30th anniversary concert at Sweden Rock Festival in 2013, a concert which was released on DVD and Blu-ray.

Personnel
Phil Lynott – bass guitar, vocals, acoustic guitar
Scott Gorham – lead and rhythm guitars
Brian Robertson – lead and rhythm guitars
Brian Downey – drums, percussion

References

External links
 

Thin Lizzy songs
1976 songs
Songs about prison
Songs written by Phil Lynott
Vertigo Records singles
1976 singles